Little Fish Lake is a lake in Alberta. It is located 43 km east from Drumheller in Little Fish Lake Provincial Park.

External links 

Little Fish Lake
Special Area No. 2